Omar Gutiérrez (born 24 September 1967) is an Argentine politician, who serves as governor of the Neuquén Province. He is the former minister of economy of the previous governor, Jorge Sapag. With his victory in the 2015 elections, the Neuquén People's Movement continues ruling the province after 53 years.

On 10 August 2020, Gutiérrez attended the inauguration ceremony of Costa Limay Sustainable Complex for Transgender Women, an affordable housing project for transgender women founded by the Catholic nun Sister Mónica Astorga Cremona.

References

1967 births
Living people
Governors of Neuquén Province
Neuquén People's Movement politicians
National University of Comahue alumni